The German Heavyweight Championship is a professional wrestling championship defended exclusively in Germany. The title has been claimed by various German independent promotions throughout the years. The first version was established in 1937 and since then many promotions have created their own versions of the German Heavyweight Championship.

Title histories

Names 

Key

Original version
The original version of the German Heavyweight Championship was created on July 15, 1937, when Hans Schmeling was billed as the German Heavyweight Champion in United Kingdom and United States. Karl Krauser was later recognized as the champion.

VoRo Agentor version (1992)
VoRo Agentor recognized a version of the German Heavyweight Championship in 1992, which the promotion called VoRo German Heavyweight Championship.

Catch Wrestling Association version (1998–1999)
Catch Wrestling Association created its own version of the German Heavyweight Championship at the Champions Night event in the Catch World Cup tour on October 10, 1998. They named it the "CWA German Championship". The championship was contested under 10 three-minute rounds.

Footnotes

Notes

Catch Wrestling Association championships
Heavyweight wrestling championships
Professional wrestling in Germany
National professional wrestling championships